Eduard Anatolyevich Uchurov (born 20 December 1979) is a former Russian professional footballer.

External links
 

1979 births
People from Elista
Living people
Russian footballers
Association football midfielders
Russian Premier League players
Russian expatriate footballers
Expatriate footballers in Kazakhstan
FC Elista players
FC Volgar Astrakhan players
Russian expatriate sportspeople in Kazakhstan
FC Volga Nizhny Novgorod players
FC Nizhny Novgorod (2007) players
FC Luch Vladivostok players
FC Baikal Irkutsk players
FC Novokuznetsk players
FC Dynamo Bryansk players
FC Spartak-UGP Anapa players
Sportspeople from Kalmykia